Manuel Octavio Bermúdez Estrada (born October 15, 1961) is a Colombian rapist and serial killer who confessed to killing 21 children in remote areas of Colombia. He has been given the nickname "El Monstruo de los Cañaduzales" ("The Monster of the Cane Fields"). He was sentenced to 40 years in prison.

Biography
Manuel Octavio Bermúdez was born  in Trujillo, Valle del Cauca, Colombia on October 15, 1961 and was orphaned after birth. He was adopted by an abusive mother who threw him off a balcony, breaking his hand and foot. This gave him a permanent limp. He was given to another family in the city of Palmira. His new parents were alcoholics and his father was described as abusive. Bermúdez later had several children of his own.

Bermúdez raped and killed at least 21 children in several towns of Valle del Cauca from 1999 to 2003. He had worked as an ice cream vendor and would lure his victims to corn fields with offers of money for picking corn. Bermúdez would then rape and strangle them to death while sometimes injecting them with a syringe to weary their legs.

The mother of 12-year-old Luis Carlos Gálvez reported his disappearance and Bermúdez had been seen with him. He was arrested on July 18, 2003. Investigators inspected a room he had rented in El Cairo and found newspaper clippings of the murders, syringes, Lidocaine, and the wristwatch Luis Carlos Gálvez was wearing the day he disappeared.

Bermúdez confessed to the murders of 21 children, 17 of whom were found and was sentenced to 25 years in prison on March 20, 2004. He is suspected of killing over 50 children.

See also
 List of serial killers in Colombia
 List of serial killers by number of victims

References

1961 births
1999 murders in Colombia
2003 murders in Colombia
1990s murders in Colombia
2000s murders in Colombia
Colombian murderers of children
Colombian people convicted of murder
Colombian rapists
Colombian serial killers
Living people
Male serial killers
People convicted of murder by Colombia
People from Valle del Cauca Department